Samundri (Urdu,) is a city and headquarters of Samundri Tehsil located in Faisalabad District of Punjab province, Pakistan.

It is the 55th largest city of Pakistan by population according to the 2017 census.

History

Etymology 
Samundri was on a major trade route during the reign of Sher Shah Suri. The present site of Samundri city was founded in 1887 as Chak No. 533 G.B. Later it was renamed as Seh Mundri because of three Hindu mandirs in the area. The word Seh means Three in Persian and Mandir is Sanskrit word for a temple.

Modern 
In 1887, there were three Hindu shrines in this area but now what remains, houses the Government Primary School No 4. Migration between India and Pakistan was continuous before the independence. By the 1930s Western Punjab was predominantly Muslim and supported the Muslim League and Pakistan Movement. After the independence in August 1947, the minority Hindus and Sikhs migrated to India while the Muslim refugees from Eastern Punjab in India settled in Western Punjab and across Pakistan. Today Samundri is known for its contributions to Pakistan's Kabaddi team providing dozens of big names especially from Chak 176 G.B and 478 G.B. It has many Gujjar, Rajput and Jat farmers who tend to be physically larger in size than elsewhere in the region.

Geography
Samundri is located at 31°03'45"N 72°57'15"E (31.063, 72.954), at an altitude of 168 metres (429 ft), and is 45 km from Faisalabad, 66 km from Jhang, 30 km from Gojra and just 15 km from Tandlianwala. The upcoming Karachi-Lahore Motorway will pass through neighborhood of Tandlianwala known as Samundari Interchange Km 1016 on Samundari-Tandlianwala Road. Then it will be easily accessible from Lahore and Multan. The Post Code of Samundari is 37300.

Economy
Samundri is home to a major grain, whole corn & sugar market. Sugarcane and wheat are the major crops of the area, while corn is the most-traded good locally. Rice is also grown here but, due to water shortages, less farmers are deciding to grow it. Vegetables are grown on many hectares and fulfilling 50% of the demand.

The Anarkali Bazaar is the main commercial market of the city, and the Jinnah Market is the oldest. Other markets in the city include Jamat Ali Bazaar, Katchery Bazaar, Mandi Bazaar, Nehar Bazaar, Qasim Bazaar, Kashmiri Bazaar, Sunny Plaza and Chaki Bazaar.

Samundri is also known for its custom truck painting business.

Major Banks in Samundari:

 National Bank of Pakistan
 Zarai Taraqiati Bank Limited
 Habib Bank Limited (2 Branches)
 United Bank Limited
 Allied Bank Limited
 Muslim Commercial Bank Limited (2 Branches)
 Bank Alfalah
 Soneri Bank
 Meezan Bank
 Faysal Bank
 Al-Barka Bank
 Bank Al-Habib

Notable residents 
 Prithviraj Kapoor, actor, director and patriarch of the Kapoor family

References

Cities and towns in Faisalabad District